Crown FC is a Nigerian professional association football club based in Ogbomosho, Oyo State, that competes in the Nigeria National League. The club plays at the Lekan Salami Stadium, with a capacity of 10,000. For the 2010–11 season they played some games at the Ilaro Stadium in nearby Ogun State and returned in 2012/2013 to the Soun Stadium.

History
They were founded in 1994 by Rev. Prof. Yusuf Ameh Obaje, a college professor, pastor and former chaplain to Olusegun Obasanjo.
Their main rivals are Oyo neighbours Shooting Stars F.C. of Ibadan. Games between the two became fierce during 3SC's relegation to the Nigeria National League in 2006. In thirteen total meetings up to 2011, 3SC held a 9–2–2 advantage.
Crown achieved promotion to the Premier League for the first time after finishing on top of the 2010 Division 1B. They were relegated back to the National League after one season and only eleven wins.

They spent two seasons at the lower level before clinching promotion on the final day of the 2013 season with a 1–0 home win over Fountain FC, finishing with a record of 14 wins 2 draws and ten losses.

Achievements
Nigeria National League: 1
2009-10

Staff
Management Board:
Mallam Bello Noah – General Manager
Engr. Alexander Olanrewaju – Executive Secretary
Alh. Wasiu Mustapha – Member
Alh. Ibraheem Ajadi – Member

Officers:
 Alhaji Fatai Olayinka (Consultant )
 Kunle Oyeleye (Media Officer)
 Tayo Oyebowale (Welfare Officer)
 Lawrence Akpokona ( Club Manager)
 Oladunni Oyekale ( Chief Coach )

External links

Abia, Taraba, Crown FC join Giwa in Glo Premier League (Nigerian Guardian)
Crown FC red hot for pro-league (http://www.compassnews.net)
Crown Management Debunks Sack Story  (29 May 2010)
Premier League Newcomers Battle For NNL Title

Football clubs in Nigeria
Ogbomosho
Association football clubs established in 1994
1994 establishments in Nigeria
Sports clubs in Nigeria